Strix may refer to:
 Strix (mythology), a legendary creature of ancient Roman mythology
 Strix (bird), a genus of large "earless" wood-owls
 Strix Ltd, manufacturer of kettle controls, thermostats and water boiling elements for domestic appliances
 Strix (TV production company), a Swedish production company
 Strix mortar round, a Swedish guided projectile
 "Strix", a pseudonym of author Peter Fleming
 "Strix", Gaming Hardware lineup from AsusTeK Computer Inc.
 Stryx, an Italian television series aired in 1978